Sporastatia is a genus of crustose lichens in the family Sporastatiaceae. It has four species. Sporastatia lichens are long-lived species that grow on siliceous or weakly calcareous rocks in arctic and alpine locales.

Taxonomy
Sporastatia was circumscribed by Italian lichenologist Abramo Bartolommeo Massalongo in 1854, with Sporastatia testudinea assigned as the type species. The name Gyrothecium, proposed by William Nylander in 1855, is a synonym of Sporastatia.

Following molecular phylogenetic studies published in 2013, Sporastatia was placed in a separate family, the Sporastatiaceae. This family was shown to have a sister taxon relationship with the family Rhizocarpaceae, and together the two families comprise the order Rhizocarpales.

Description

Characteristics of the genus include the crust-like thallus underlain by a black prothallus that is revealed around the margins; lecideine apothecia, and asci that contain 100–200 spores.

Some Sporastatia species are hosts for lichenicolous fungi, including Rhizocarpon pusillum, R. asiaticum, and Miriquidica invadens.

Species
Sporastatia crassulata  – Altai Mountains
Sporastatia karakorina 
Sporastatia polyspora 
Sporastatia testudinea 

The taxon Sporastatia desmaspora  is now known as Biatorella desmaspora.

References

Lecanoromycetes
Lecanoromycetes genera
Taxa described in 1855
Taxa named by Abramo Bartolommeo Massalongo